Veiðivötn ("fishing lakes") is a volcanic lake region in the Highlands of central Iceland, where approximately 50 lakes fill two rows of fissure vents.

Geologically, Veiðivötn is part of the Bárðarbunga volcanic system.

In  6600 B.C., long before the settlement of Iceland, prehistoric eruptions from the region produced the Þjórsá Lava, the largest lava flow in Iceland, and the largest to have erupted anywhere on Earth during the Holocene.

Veiðivötn's current landscape was created in 1477 by an explosive VEI-6 fissure eruption of tholeiitic basalt.  It was the largest volcanic eruption in Iceland's recorded history.

Today, many of the fissures from the 1477 eruption are filled with water lakes that have become popular for trout fishing.

References 

1477 in Europe
Bárðarbunga
East Volcanic Zone of Iceland
Fissure vents
Highlands of Iceland
Holocene volcanoes
Maars
Recreational fishing
Rift lakes of Iceland
VEI-6 volcanoes
Volcanic crater lakes
Volcanic eruptions in Iceland
Volcanoes of Iceland